The  Yale Center for Environmental Law & Policy is a joint initiative between the Yale School of Forestry & Environmental Studies and the Yale Law School.

Mission
The Yale Center for Environmental Law & Policy  seeks to advance fresh thinking and analytically rigorous approaches to environmental decisionmaking – across disciplines, sectors, and boundaries.

History
Established in 1994, the Yale Center for Environmental Law & Policy is a joint initiative between the Yale School of Forestry & Environmental Studies and the Yale Law School.

The Yale School of Forestry & Environmental Studies, founded in 1900 by Gifford Pinchot, the first director of the U.S. Forest Service, helped to launch the conservation and natural resource management movement in the early 1900s. The School's graduates have provided ongoing leadership in the environmental and natural resource fields, both domestically and internationally.

Graduates of Yale Law School were the prime movers behind the environmental law movement of the late 1960s and early 1970s, founding  organizations such as the Environmental Defense Fund and the Natural Resources Defense Council. Yale Law School students are active in the Yale Environmental Law Association and special projects organized by the Center for Environmental Law & Policy.

Program areas
Environmental Performance Measurement - The Environmental Performance Measurement (EPM) Project aims to shift environmental decision-making onto firmer analytic foundations using environmental indicators and statistics.   In collaboration with the Center for International Earth Science Information Network at Columbia University and the World Economic Forum, the project produces a periodically updated Environmental Sustainability Index (ESI) that tracks 146 countries on 21 sustainability indicators. Work is now under way on an Environmental Performance Index (EPI) that will assess key environmental policy outcomes using trend analysis and policy targets linked to the Millennium Development Goals. The 2006 Pilot EPI was released in Davos, Switzerland, at the annual meeting of the World Economic Forum on Thursday, 26 January 2006.
Environmental Attitudes and Behavior - The Environmental Attitudes and Behavior Program strives to address the relationship between Americans’ environmental values and subsequent personal and political decisionmaking.
Innovations and the Environment - The Innovation and Environment Program develops theory and practice at the nexus of business and the environment. The goal of this work is three-fold: To integrate environmental thinking into corporate strategy; To support the economic utility of environment-related business ventures; and To encourage environmental organizations and policymakers to be more "business-like" in their decisionmaking and management.  This Program is a shared endeavor with the Center for Business and the Environment at Yale.
Environmental Governance - The Environmental Governance Program aims to produce scholarly analysis and tools with policy application for government authorities, communities, NGO leaders, and corporate executives. Environmental governance research projects include the Global Environmental Governance Project and the UNITAR-Yale Environment and Democracy Initiative.
Yale Environmental Protection Clinic - The Yale Environmental Protection Clinic is designed to introduce students to the fields of environmental advocacy and policymaking by exploring a variety of environmental law and policy questions and the tools environmental professionals use to address them.  As a part of the program, teams of three to four students work with client organizations on "real-world" projects, with the goal of producing a major work product for the client by the end of the semester.

People and partners

Faculty researchers and staff
Daniel C. Esty, Director
Kit Kennedy, Director, Environmental Law Clinic
Benjamin Cashore, Affiliated Faculty, Environmental Governance
Bradford S. Gentry, Principal Investigator, Private International Finance and the Environment Project
Ysella Yoder, Program Manager
Susanne Stahl, Communications Associate
John Emerson, Affiliated Faculty, Environmental Performance Measurement
William Dornbos, Associate Director
Maria Ivanova, Project Director, Global Environmental Governance Project
Anthony Leisrowitz, Affiliated Research Scientist, Environmental Attitudes and Behavior

Faculty advisors
Mark Ashton, Professor of Silviculture & Forest Ecology, School of Forestry & Environmental Studies
Robert Bailis, Assistant Professor of Environmental Social Science, School of Forestry & Environmental Studies
Michelle Bell, Assistant Professor of Environmental Health, School of Forestry & Environmental Studies, Chemical Engineering
Gaboury Benoit, Professor of Environmental Chemistry, School of Forestry & Environmental Studies; Professor of Environmental Engineering
Jonathan Borak, Associate Clinical Professor of Medicine and Public Health Director, Yale Interdisciplinary Risk Assessment Forum
Marian Chertow, Assistant Professor of Industrial Environmental Management, School of Forestry & Environmental Studies
William Ellis, Senior Visiting Fellow, School of Forestry & Environmental Studies
Thomas Graedel, Clifton R. Musser Professor of Industrial Ecology, School of Forestry & Environmental Studies; Professor of Chemical Engineering; Professor of Geology and Geophysics
Arnulf Grübler, Professor of Field of Energy and Technology, School of Forestry & Environmental Studies
Dan Kahan, Elizabeth K. Dollard Professor of Law at Yale Law School
Doug Kysar, Professor of Law, Yale University
Xuhui Lee, Professor of Forestry and Biometeorology, School of Forestry & Environmental Studies
Reid Lifset, Associate Director of the Industrial Environmental Management Program and Editor of the Journal of Industrial Ecology, School of Forestry & Environmental Studies
Erin Mansur, Assistant Professor of Environmental Economics, School of Forestry & Environmental Studies and School of Management
Robert Mendelsohn, Edwin Weyerhaeuser Davis Professor of Forest Policy and Economics, School of Forestry & Environmental Studies and School of Management
Sheila Olmstead, Assistant Professor of Environmental Economics, School of Forestry & Environmental Studies
Peter Raymond, Assistant Professor, School of Forestry & Environmental Studies
Oswald Schmitz, Professor of Population and Community Ecology, School of Forestry & Environmental Studies; Professor of Ecology and Evolutionary Biology
David Skelly, Professor of Ecology, School of Forestry & Environmental Studies; Professor of Ecology and Evolutionary Biology
Gus Speth, Dean and Professor in the Practice of Sustainable Development, School of Forestry & Environmental Studies
Simon Tay, Visiting Associate Professor, School of Forestry & Environmental Studies
John Wargo, Professor of Environmental Risk Analysis and Policy, School of Forestry & Environmental Studies

Research affiliates
Sybil Ackerman, Executive Director, The Lazar Foundation
Monica Araya, Office of the Vice Chairman at Climate Change Capital
James Cameron, Vice Chairman, Climate Change Capital
Emil Frankel, Director of Transportation Policy, Bipartisan Policy Center
Achim Alexander Halpaap, M.Ph, MA Director, Unitar/Yale Environment and Democracy Project
Harri Kalimo, Professor, Institute for European Studies
Sascha Mueller-Kraenner, Vice-Chairman, Ecologic Institute
Tanja Srebotnjak, Senior Fellow, Ecologic Institute
Andrew Winston, Founder, Winston Eco-Strategies

Partners
Center for International Earth Science Information Network, Columbia University
The College of William and Mary
Renewable Energy and International Law Project
United Nations Institute for Training and Research
Vermont Law School
Yale Center for Business and the Environment
Yale Center for the Study of Globalization
Yale Project on Climate Change Communication

External links
Yale Center for Environmental Law & Policy
Yale Environmental Law Association 

Environmental organizations based in Connecticut
Yale University
1994 establishments in Connecticut